The 2012–13 Biathlon World Cup – World Cup 1 is the opening event of the season and is held in Östersund, Sweden, from 25 November until 2 December 2012.

Schedule of events

Medal winners

Men

Women

Mixed

Achievements 

 Best performance for all time

 , 3rd place in Individual
 , 8th place in Individual
 , 10th place in Individual
 , 12th place in Individual
 , 21st place in Individual
 , 80th place in Individual
 , 102nd place in Individual and 96th in Sprint
 , 103rd place in Individual and Sprint
 , 1st place in Sprint
 , 4th place in Sprint
 , 5th place in Sprint
 , 26th place in Sprint
 , 33rd place in Sprint
 , 38th place in Sprint
 , 39th place in Sprint
 , 47th place in Sprint
 , 23rd place in Pursuit
 , 34th place in Pursuit
 , 3rd place in Individual
 , 4th place in Individual
 , 10th place in Individual
 , 18th place in Individual and 12th in Sprint
 , 35th place in Individual
 , 39th place in Individual
 , 42nd place in Individual
 , 51st place in Individual and 42nd in Sprint
 , 56th place in Individual
 , 87th place in Individual
 , 2nd place in Sprint
 , 6th place in Sprint
 , 13th place in Sprint
 , 22nd place in Sprint
 , 31st place in Sprint
 , 59th place in Sprint and 49th in Pursuit
 , 66th place in Sprint
 , 76th place in Sprint
 , 91st place in Sprint
 , 28th place in Pursuit

 First World Cup race

 , 7th place in Individual
 , 42nd place in Individual
 , 50th place in Individual
 , 85th place in Individual
 , 88th place in Individual
 , 27th place in Sprint
 , 28th place in Individual
 , 63rd place in Individual
 , 71st place in Individual
 , 91st place in Individual
 , 100th place in Individual
 , 30th place in Sprint
 , 88th place in Sprint
 , 92nd place in Sprint

References 

Biathlon World Cup - World Cup 1, 2012-13
- World Cup 1
Biathlon World Cup - World Cup 1
Biathlon World Cup - World Cup 1
Biathlon competitions in Sweden
Sports competitions in Östersund